The Auchlochan Collieries were several collieries in Auchlochan and Coalburn, South Lanarkshire, Scotland. Production started in 1894 - run by Caprington and Auchlochan Collieries Ltd and then by William Dixon & Company from the 1930s before the NCB took over in 1947 - ending in 1968 when the collieries closed. They were served at Auchlochan Platform railway station, part of the Coalburn Branch of the Caledonian Railway. 
Eight people were killed at the collieries.

Collieries 
 Auchlochan Colliery, Auchlochan  
 Auchlochan No. 1 Colliery, Coalburn 
 Auchlochan No. 2 Colliery, Coalburn 
 Auchlochan No.6 Colliery, Coalburn 
 Auchlochan No. 7 Colliery, Coalburn 
 Auchlochan No. 8 Colliery, Coalburn 
 Auchlochan No.9 Colliery, Auchlochan 
 Auchlochan No.10 Colliery, Auchlochan

References

History of South Lanarkshire
Coal mines in Scotland
Former mines in Scotland
Underground mines in Scotland
1890 establishments in Scotland
1968 disestablishments in Scotland
Buildings and structures in South Lanarkshire